Marcelo de Lima Henrique (Rio de Janeiro, 26 August 1971) is a Brazilian football referee. He refereed at 2014 FIFA World Cup qualifiers. In August 2022, he became the oldest referee in the Campeonato Brasileiro Série A. Marcelo was FIFA listed between 2008 and 2014. He served in the Brazilian navy before becoming a full-time referee.

References

1971 births
Living people
Brazilian football referees